Pelecanus cadimurka is a fossil pelican from the Late Pliocene Kanunka fauna of the upper Tirari Formation, in the Lake Eyre basin of north-eastern South Australia.

References

Pelecanus
Pliocene birds
Fossil taxa described in 1981
Prehistoric birds of Australia